Leonard J. Elmore (born March 28, 1952) is an American sportscaster, lawyer and former National Basketball Association (NBA) player. Elmore has served as a college basketball analyst for ESPN and Fox Sports and has served in the same capacity for CBS Sports' coverage of the NCAA Tournament and NBA. He played in the NBA from 1974-1984 for various teams, including the Indiana Pacers, Kansas City Kings, Milwaukee Bucks, New Jersey Nets, and New York Knicks.

Early life and NBA career
Elmore attended Power Memorial Academy in New York City, leading its basketball team to the City championship and the "Number 1 Team in the Nation" in 1970. He graduated from the University of Maryland College Park in 1974 where he was a three-time All-ACC player and an All-American in 1974. He is still Maryland's all-time leading rebounder, in both total rebounds and rebounding average. In 2002, Elmore was selected to the ACC 50th Anniversary men's basketball team, honoring him as one of the 50 greatest players in ACC history.

Elmore is a ten-year veteran of the NBA having played for the Indiana Pacers, Kansas City Kings (currently known as the Sacramento Kings), Milwaukee Bucks, New Jersey Nets (Brooklyn Nets), New York Knicks, and he also played two seasons with the Pacers when they were in the ABA.

Career statistics

ABA

Regular season

|-
| align="left" | 1974–75
| align="left" | Indiana
| 77 || - || 18.4 || .417 || 1.000 || .774 || 5.1 || 0.5 || 0.9 || 1.2 || 6.6
|-
| align="left" | 1975–76
| align="left" | Indiana
| 76 || - || 34.1 || .402 || .000 || .738 || 10.8 || 1.6 || 1.8 || 2.3 || 14.6
|- class="sortbottom"
| style="text-align:center;" colspan="2"| Career
| 153 || - || 26.2 || .407 || .250 || .749 || 7.9 || 1.0 || 1.3 || 1.8 || 10.6
|}

Playoffs

|-
| align="left" | 1974–75
| align="left" | Indiana
| 18 || - || 31.4 || .437 || .000 || .676 || 8.1 || 0.9 || 1.2 || 2.2 || 10.6
|-
| align="left" | 1975–76
| align="left" | Indiana
| 3 || - || 22.7 || .300 || .000 || 1.000 || 5.0 || 1.3 || 1.7 || 0.7 || 6.3
|- class="sortbottom"
| style="text-align:center;" colspan="2"| Career
| 21 || - || 30.1 || .418 || .000 || .684 || 7.6 || 1.0 || 1.2 || 2.0 || 10.0
|}

NBA

Regular season

|-
| align="left" | 1976–77
| align="left" | Indiana
| 6 || - || 7.7 || .412 || - || .800 || 2.5 || 0.3 || 0.0 || 0.7 || 3.0
|-
| align="left" | 1977–78
| align="left" | Indiana
| 69 || - || 19.2 || .368 || - || .667 || 6.1 || 1.2 || 1.1 || 1.0 || 5.4
|-
| align="left" | 1978–79
| align="left" | Indiana
| 80 || - || 15.8 || .406 || - || .718 || 5.0 || 0.9 || 0.8 || 1.0 || 4.2
|-
| align="left" | 1979–80
| align="left" | Kansas City
| 58 || - || 15.8 || .430 || .000 || .689 || 4.4 || 1.1 || 0.7 || 0.7 || 4.5
|-
| align="left" | 1980–81
| align="left" | Milwaukee
| 72 || - || 12.8 || .358 || .000 || .720 || 2.9 || 1.0 || 0.5 || 0.7 || 2.9
|-
| align="left" | 1981–82
| align="left" | New Jersey
| 81 || 70 || 25.9 || .460 || .000 || .794 || 5.4 || 1.2 || 1.1 || 1.1 || 9.1
|-
| align="left" | 1982–83
| align="left" | New Jersey
| 74 || 0 || 13.2 || .398 || .000 || .643 || 3.2 || 0.5 || 0.6 || 0.5 || 3.4
|-
| align="left" | 1983–84
| align="left" | New York
| 65 || 5 || 12.8 || .408 || .000 || .711 || 2.5 || 0.5 || 0.4 || 0.5 || 2.4
|- class="sortbottom"
| style="text-align:center;" colspan="2"| Career
| 505 || 75 || 16.6 || .413 || .000 || .715 || 4.2 || 0.9 || 0.8 || 0.8 || 4.6
|}

Playoffs

|-
| align="left" | 1979–80
| align="left" | Kansas City
| 3 || - || 14.3 || .308 || .000 || .500 || 3.7 || 0.3 || 1.0 || 0.3 || 3.0
|-
| align="left" | 1980–81
| align="left" | Milwaukee
| 4 || - || 3.0 || .000 || .000 || .000 || 0.0 || 0.0 || 0.0 || 0.0 || 0.0
|-
| align="left" | 1981–82
| align="left" | New Jersey
| 2 || - || 38.0 || .563 || .000 || 1.000 || 8.0 || 1.0 || 0.5 || 1.0 || 11.0
|-
| align="left" | 1982–83
| align="left" | New Jersey
| 2 || - || 7.5 || .400 || .000 || .500 || 4.5 || 0.5 || 0.5 || 0.0 || 2.5
|- class="sortbottom"
| style="text-align:center;" colspan="2"| Career
| 11 || - || 13.3 || .429 || .000 || .750 || 3.3 || 0.4 || 0.5 || 0.3 || 3.3
|}

Broadcasting career
In 1990, Elmore served as the color commentator for CBS' number-two NBA broadcasting team (behind Dick Stockton and Hubie Brown), calling much of the Western Conference Playoff action alongside play-by-play man Verne Lundquist. He was also paired with Kevin Harlan for the first season for the Minnesota Timberwolves in the NBA. In 1992, Elmore alongside Lundquist, called the legendary East Regional Final between Duke and Kentucky, which ended with Duke's Christian Laettner's game-winning shot.

Elmore posted on his Twitter account that he was one of over 100 employees at ESPN that were laid off in April 2017.

Law career
Elmore received a J.D. from Harvard Law School in 1987 and began his law career as a prosecutor, serving as an Assistant District Attorney in Brooklyn, New York.

Aside from his announcing duties, Elmore also previously served as Senior Counsel with LeBoeuf, Lamb, Greene & MacRae in New York City, where he currently resides and is the president of the National Basketball Retired Players Association. He also is a member of the Knight Commission on Intercollegiate Athletics.

Elmore teaches Seminar in Sports Media and Athlete Activism and Social Justice in Columbia University's Master of Science Program in Sports Management.

References

Sources
NBA: Len Elmore player stats
Basketball Reference

Len Elmore ESPN Bio
Len Elmore Columbia University Faculty Bio

1952 births
Living people
African-American basketball players
All-American college men's basketball players
American men's basketball players
American sports agents
Basketball players from New York City
Centers (basketball)
College basketball announcers in the United States
County district attorneys in New York (state)
Harvard Law School alumni
Indiana Pacers players
Kansas City Kings players
Maryland Terrapins men's basketball players
Milwaukee Bucks players
Minnesota Timberwolves announcers
New Jersey Nets players
New York Knicks players
New York (state) lawyers
Power forwards (basketball)
Washington Bullets draft picks
21st-century African-American people
20th-century African-American sportspeople